The abbreviation or term UWSA may mean:
 United Wa State Army, in Myanmar
 Upper West Success Academy, former name of a school that is part of Success Academy Charter Schools, New York, N.Y., U.S.A. 
 USMLE World Self Assessment - (simulated practice exams for step 1 and step 2)